"Ride" is a song recorded by American singer SoMo. The song serves as the lead single from his debut self-titled studio album, SoMo. It was written by SoMo with Cody Tarpley, and produced by the latter. The song was released on December 7, 2013 by Republic Records.

Ride reached a peak of number 76 on the Billboard Hot 100 chart and number 11 on the US Hot R&B/Hip-Hop Songs. The song's music video was released on January 17, 2014.

The song's official remix features new verses by Ty Dolla Sign and K Camp.

Composition
"Ride is written in the key of G minor with a slow tempo of 58 beats per minute.  The song follows a chord progression of Emaj7Bsus2Dm7Cm7, and SoMo's vocals span from F3 to D6.

Chart performance

Weekly charts

Year-end charts

Certifications

Chase Rice version

American country music singer Chase Rice recorded a version of "Ride" which was a bonus track on his album Ignite the Night. The version was recorded after Rice jokingly tweeted SoMo a Photoshopped cover of his face on SoMo's album, and SoMo tweeted back that Rice should record a country version of the song. Somo is featured in Rice’s music video.   This version reached No. 38 on the Hot Country Songs chart, and has sold 413,000 copies in the US as of February 2016.

Chart performance

Year-end charts

References

Contemporary R&B ballads
SoMo songs
2013 singles
2013 songs
Columbia Nashville Records singles
Republic Records singles